|}

The Fillies' Trial Stakes is a Listed flat horse race in Great Britain open to three-year-old fillies. It is run over a distance of 1 mile and 2 furlongs at Newbury in May.

History
The race was formerly called the Sandleford Priory Stakes. It was named after Sandleford Priory, a historic building located to the south of Newbury.

The event was renamed in memory of Sir Charles Clore, a successful racehorse owner, in 1980. It continued as the Sir Charles Clore Memorial Stakes until 1988.

The title "Fillies' Trial Stakes" was introduced in 1989. From this point the race was sponsored by William Hill, and it was later backed by Vodafone. Swettenham Stud took over the sponsorship in 2002 and backed the race until the 2014 running. Since 2015 it has been sponsored by Haras de Bouquetot.

The Fillies' Trial Stakes can serve as a trial for the Epsom Oaks. The last participant to win the Oaks was Dancing Rain, the runner-up in 2011.The 2022 winner, Nashwa, won the Prix de Diane, France's equivalent of the Oaks.

Records
Leading jockey since 1971 (4 wins):
 Lester Piggott – Mandera (1973), Furioso (1974), Strigida (1981), Circus Plume (1984)
 Ray Cochrane – Merle (1985), Sudden Love (1988), Saratoga Source (1992), Mezzogiorno (1996)

Leading trainer since 1971 (5 wins):
 Henry Cecil – Strigida (1981), Yashmak (1997), Jibe (1998), Apple Charlotte (2009), Principal Role (2010)
 Sir Michael Stoute – Knoosh (1989), Kartajana (1990), Scottish Stage (2006),  Crystal Zvezda (2015), Queen Power (2019)

Winners since 1971

See also
 Horse racing in Great Britain
 List of British flat horse races

References

 Paris-Turf:
 Racing Post:
 pedigreequery.com – Swettenham Stud Fillies' Trial Stakes – Newbury.

Flat horse races for three-year-old fillies
Newbury Racecourse
Flat races in Great Britain